Robert Jewell Withers (1824–1894) was an English ecclesiastical architect.

Early life
Robert Jewell Withers was born on 2 February 1824 in Shepton Mallet, Somerset, England. His father was John Alexander Withers and his mother, Maria Jewell. He had a brother, Frederick Clarke Withers, who also became an architect and worked in America.

Career
Withers began his career as an architect in Sherborne, Dorset, in 1848. By 1850, he moved his practice to London. Withers became a member of the Royal Institute of British Architects in 1873.

Selected works 

 1863–1865: St Dogfael, Meline – rebuilding
 1864–1866: St David's, Henfynyw – rebuilding
 1876: St James, Norlands, Holland Park – addition of chancel and vestries to the 1845 building designed by Lewis Vulliamy
 1879: St James, Avebury – chancel largely rebuilt

Personal life
Withers married Catherine Vaux on 20 April 1854 at the parish church in Croydon. They had four sons and five daughters. He was an organist at St John's Church, Kennington.

Withers died on 7 October 1894 in London.

References

1824 births
1894 deaths
People from Somerset
English ecclesiastical architects